Conway High School is a comprehensive public school in Conway, Arkansas, United States. Conway High School serves over 2,000 students and is administered by the Conway School District. The school has been nationally recognized as a Blue Ribbon School of Excellence, and has won 50 state championships in numerous interscholastic sports.

History
Established in 1928, the original buildings of Conway High School served the surrounding community until new facilities were built in 1937 at the corner of Prince St and Davis St. A cafeteria was added in 1948 and a gymnasium in 1949. The cafeteria was demolished in 1961. A new high school campus, using a honeycomb pods system, was constructed in 1968 five blocks west of the original high school on Prince St. Due to student growth in the 1990s, a new junior high was built and the high school's student population was broken up, with 9th and 10th graders attending class at the original high school at Prince and Davis Streets, called the East Campus, while 11th and 12th graders attended class at the main campus, called the West Campus. In 2012 construction of a new high school began next to the old West Campus pods, and was completed in 2013. The pods buildings were then demolished. The new West Campus has 3 floors and 2100 students as of the 2015-16 school year.

Academics 
Conway High School is accredited by the Arkansas Department of Education (ADE). In 1984-85, Conway High School was honored as a National Blue Ribbon School by the U.S. Department of Education (ED).

Curriculum 
The school's assumed course of study is based on the Smart Core curriculum developed by the ADE. The school offers regular (core and career focus) courses and exams and students may select from 22 Advanced Placement (AP) coursework and exams that provide an opportunity for college credit.

Conway Area Career Center 
Located on the campus of Conway High School is the Conway Area Career Center, which fosters career and technical education. The Conway Area Career Center offers numerous professional certification programs in welding, photography, health science technology for medical professionals, and family and consumer sciences. The Center maintains affiliations with the various schools' programs for Future Business Leaders of America (FBLA), Family, Career and Community Leaders of America (FCCLA), FFA, SkillsUSA, Health Occupations Students of America (HOSA), and JROTC.

Extracurricular activities 

The Conway High School mascot is the Wampus cat, stylized as a mythical, 6-legged swamp cat.  The school colors are royal blue and white.

Athletics 
The Conway Wampus Cats participate in numerous interscholastic sports and activities in the state's largest classification (7A) within the 7A/6A Central Conference administered by the Arkansas Activities Association including: baseball, basketball (boys/girls), bowling (boys/girls), cheer, cross country (boys/girls), dance, football, golf (boys/girls), soccer (boys/girls), softball, swimming (boys/girls), tennis (boys/girls), track (boys/girls), volleyball and wrestling. Home football games are played at John McConnell Stadium, named in 1993 after the late community leader and school board president.

The Conway Wampus Cats have been competitive at the district and state level for several years. For example, the Wampus Cats baseball teams have been to ten state championship games (winning four total) and 30 state tournaments. The girls track teams won four consecutive titles from 1986 to 1989. In all, the Conway Wampus Cats have won over 50 state championships including:

 Football state champions (2x): 1964, 1967
 Volleyball state champions (2x): 1998, 2018
 Cross country state champions (4x): Boys – 1964, 1965, 1987; Girls – 1986
 Golf state champions (9x): Boys – 1978, 1982, 2002, 2006, 2008, 2011, 2012; Girls - 2012, 2016
 Basketball state champions (8x): Boys - 1973, 1974, 1976, 2010, 2020; Girls - 2008, 2014, 2023
 Swimming & diving state champions (4x): Boys – 1988, 2020; Girls – 1988, 2013
 Soccer state champions (4x): Boys - 2004, 2008, 2022; Girls – 2011
 Wrestling state champions: 2011 
 Bowling state champions: Girls - 2003 
 Baseball state champions (4x): 1911, 1989, 2011, 2022
 Track & Field state champions (12x): Boys – 1953, 1954, 1957, 1960, 1963, 1981, 1989, 1992; Girls – 1986, 1987, 1988, 1989

In 2002, baseball head coach Noel Boucher, for his work on Wampus Cat Field, was selected as the District 6 Groundkeeper/Field of the Year by the National High School Baseball Coaches of America.

Clubs and traditions 
Conway High School also has a dominant quiz bowl program. The team has made it to 7A division state finals from 2015 to 2019, winning in 2015, 2017, and 2018, and finishing as runners-up in 2016 and 2019.

In 2019, Conway High School’s Mock Trial team won the state championship and advanced to the national competition, where they placed 30th.

Notable alumni 
The following are notable people associated with Conway High School. If the person was a Conway High School student, the number in parentheses indicates the year of graduation; if the person was a faculty or staff member, that person's title and years of association are listed.

 Marvin Delph (1974) — Former high school and collegiate basketball player; led Wampus Cats to state titles in 1973 and 1974; was a member of the famed "Triplets" on the 1977-78 Arkansas Razorbacks men's basketball team that won the 1978 Southwest Conference championship and made it to the 1978 Final Four. 
 Peyton Hillis (2004) — Former Arkansas Razorback running back, was on the 2006 Southeastern Conference Western Division championship team; spent 7 years in the National Football League (NFL), rushed for over 1,000 yards in 2010 for the Cleveland Browns; was on the cover of the Madden NFL 12 video game; actor. 
 Greg Lasker (1982) — College professor; former Arkansas Razorback safety, was on the 1985 Holiday Bowl championship team, named to the Arkansas 1980's All-Decade Team; NFL safety from 1986 to 1988; won Super Bowl XXI with the NY Giants.
 Bryce Molder (1997) — Professional golfer on the PGA Tour; won the 2011 Frys.com Open.
 Ernie Ruple (1964) — Former High School All-State, University of Arkansas Razorback, and NFL player.
 Robbie Wills (1986) — Lawyer and politician; Speaker of the House, Arkansas House of Representatives.
 Stanley Russ - lawyer and politician; Arkansas state senator from 1975-2001. 
 Mike Isom - Former Wampus Cat football player and retired coach. As head coach from 1990 to 1999, Isom led the University of Central Arkansas to three conference championships and the 1991 NAIA national championship. 
 Ken Stephens (1948) - Former Wampus Cat football and track and field athlete, played for the Arkansas Razorbacks; head coach of University of Central Arkansas, Arkansas Tech University, and Lamar University in Beaumont, Texas. 
 Tim Horton (1986) - Former Arkansas Razorbacks football player, and current assistant football coach. Played wide receiver for the Hogs 1988 and 1989 Southwest Conference championship teams. Horton has coached at Arkansas, Appalachian State, Kansas State, Auburn, Vanderbilt, and is currently the special teams coordinator at the Air Force Academy. 
 Amy Miles - recording artist and performer.

References

External links 
 

Public high schools in Arkansas
Schools in Faulkner County, Arkansas
Buildings and structures in Conway, Arkansas
Educational institutions established in 1928
1928 establishments in Arkansas